Hypsopygia flavamaculata is a species of snout moth in the genus Hypsopygia. It was described by M. Shaffer, Ebbe Nielsen and Marianne Horak and is found in Australia.

References

Moths described in 1996
Pyralini